Bayjan may refer to:
 Bayjan, Fars (بايجان - Bāyjān)
 Bayjan, Mazandaran (بائيجان - Bā’yjān)
 Bayjan, West Azerbaijan (بايجان - Bāyjān)

See also
 Bajan (disambiguation)